Wet is an American indie pop group from Brooklyn, New York. The band's first two albums—the 2013 self-titled EP and 2016 Don't You—are credited to Kelly Zutrau, Joe Valle, and Marty Sulkow. In March 2018, Wet released a single, "There's a Reason", as a duo of Zutrau and Valle. Signed to Columbia Records, Wet was named the most promising group in music by The Fader in 2015.

History
Members Kelly Zutrau, Joe Valle, and Marty Sulkow met in New York through mutual friends while Sulkow and Valle were attending New York University and Zutrau was a student at Cooper Union. Sulkow and Zutrau formed a band called Beauty Feast in 2007. It grew to seven members but eventually dissolved. Zutrau went on to the Rhode Island School of Design, but continued to write music. Sulkow and Valle became involved with her work and in 2012 the group moved in together in Sulkow's apartment in Bedford–Stuyvesant, Brooklyn.

Neon Gold and Wet 
The group began booking gigs around Brooklyn and posting music online, gaining attention around 2013. Wet signed with the boutique record label Neon Gold during that same year. Neon Gold had a partnership with Columbia Records at the time Wet signed with them. The label switched its partnership to Atlantic Records in 2014 and Wet subsequently signed with Columbia after fielding offers from numerous major labels. On September 24, Neon Gold announced that Wet would be releasing a self-titled extended play. It was released on October 3 and October 15 on the band's Bandcamp page.

Don't You 
The group moved to Western Massachusetts in 2014 where they began working on their debut album under Columbia. The album, titled Don't You, was released on January 29, 2016. It reached number 76 on the Billboard 200 and number 55 on the Canadian Albums Chart.

In October 2016, the band released a pair of singles, "The Middle" and "Turn Away".

Still Run 
Following Sulkow's departure in 2017 due to creative differences, Wet released the single "There's a Reason" in March 2018 as a duo consisting of Zutrau and Valle; Andrew Sarlo is also credited as a producer. On April 13, 2018, the band released "Softens", the second song from their then-upcoming second studio album, Still Run.

Letter Blue 
Sulkow rejoined Wet in 2021 for their third studio album, Letter Blue, released on October 22, 2021, by AWAL, after the band parted ways with Columbia Records.

Members 
 Kelly Zutrau – lead vocals
 Joe Valle – production 
 Marty Sulkow – guitar (2012–2017, 2021–present)

Discography

Studio albums

Extended plays

Singles

References

External links
 

2012 establishments in New York City
American contemporary R&B musical groups
American musical trios
American synth-pop groups
Columbia Records artists
Dream pop musical groups
Electronic music groups from New York (state)
Indie pop groups from New York (state)
Indietronica music groups
Musical groups established in 2012
Musical groups from Brooklyn